The Iraq FA Basra League was the top-level division of football in Basra between 1948 and 1973. It was controlled by the Basra branch of the Iraq Football Association and was one of four regional league championships played in Iraq at the time, with the others being in Baghdad, Kirkuk and Mosul. The first champions of the competition were Al-Minaa, who won the title in the 1948–49 season.

The regional leagues folded in 1973 and were replaced by the Iraqi National First Division. Al-Minaa were the competition's most successful team with 15 titles.

List of champions

See also
 List of Iraqi football champions
 Iraqi Premier League
 Iraqi Women's Football League

References

External links
Iraqi Football Website

 
Football leagues in Iraq